The Éditions du Rocher is a publishing house based in Monaco. It publishes works of literature as well as books about current affairs and well-being. It was founded by Charles Orengo in 1943. It was sold to Éditions Privat in 2005, Éditions Desclée de Brouwer in 2009, and Éditions Artège in 2014.

Further reading

References

Publishing companies of Monaco
Publishing companies established in 1943
1943 establishments in Monaco